Estadio José Manuel Moreno  is a multi-purpose stadium in Merlo Partido, Argentina.  It is currently used primarily for football matches and hosts the home matches of Primera B Nacional Argentina club, Club Social y Deportivo Merlo.  The capacity of the stadium is 5,000 spectators.  It is named after former Argentine football player, José Manuel Moreno.

References

External links

Venue information 

Football venues in Argentina
Multi-purpose stadiums in Argentina
Sports venues in Buenos Aires Province